State Road 121 (SR 121) is a major state highway that runs north and south in northern Florida. The road is part of a long multi-state route that also goes through Georgia and South Carolina.

Route description
SR 121 is one of the major routes of a three-state highway 121 that totals approximately 475 miles (764 km) from Lebanon Station, Florida, to Rock Hill, South Carolina.

Beginning in Lebanon Station at a channelized intersection with US 19/US 98 and County Road 336 (CR 336) in Levy County, SR 121 travels through Goethe State Forest where it turns east and intersects CR 337. The road makes a sharp left curve to the northeast where it travels through desolate farmland; the only resemblance to a major intersection is CR 326. Within the city of Williston, SR 121 has a concurrency with CR 316, until the intersection with US 41. It then joins US 41 as CR 316 continues eastward, which then joins the east end of US 27 Alternate (US 27 Alt.), and then the US 27/US 41 concurrency before breaking away to the northeast again, taking the DeSoto Trail away from US 41.

North of CR 335, SR 121 hugs the west side of the Levy–Marion county line, but never crosses it, choosing to enter Alachua County instead. Immediately after the interchange with Interstate 75 (I-75) at exit 382, SR 121 makes a sharp left onto Northwest 34th Street as SR 331 becomes the designation for Williston Road. As it crosses SR 24 it borders the western edge of the University of Florida, passing along the 34th Street Wall just before crossing SR 26A and then SR 26. North of US 441, the DeSoto Trail breaks away.

Within the town of LaCrosse, SR 121 shares a short concurrency with SR 235, then has a level crossing with the CSX Brooker Subdivision, a former Seaboard Coast Line railroad line that leads to the Crystal River 3 Nuclear Power Plant. After the intersection with CR 236 in Santa Fe, SR 121 passes by entrances to the Santa Fe River Preserve, and then is carried along a bridge over the Santa Fe River in Worthington Springs, where it intersects SR 18. North of CR 18, the road is carried along a bridge over the former Jacksonville and Southwestern Railroad.

Briefly traveling parallel to SR 100 in Lake Butler, it intersects SR 100 as it continues northeast. The road also intersects SR 16 in Raiford, and I-10 (Exit 335) and US 90 in Macclenny close to SR 228 before crossing the Georgia state line on its way to South Carolina.

History

The segment between US 19 and 98 in Lebanon Station and US 41 in Williston was previously designated as Florida State Road 335, and the segment between US 27 and 41 in Williston, at what is today the south end of SR 331 was part of a southern extension of that route. 
State Road 23 was defined in the 1945 renumbering as:

Prior to the renumbering, this had been:
 SR 99 from northwest of Paradise to Worthington Springs
 SR 113 from northwest of Paradise to LaCrosse
 SR 49 from Worthington Springs to Georgia

At some point, SR 23 was renumbered as part of SR 121, probably to match Georgia State Route 121. Before that, however, SR 23 had been extended around the west side of Gainesville to end at US 441/SR 25 at Rocky Point, and the southernmost part did not become part of SR 121. It was later given to the county, and has a possibility of becoming County Road 23.

The State Road 23 designation has since been reused for a partial beltway around Jacksonville.

In 1975, the City of Gainesville recommended a truck ban along SR 121 and established a truck route around downtown. In 1979. FDOT widened the road within the city, which included the creation of a retaining wall along the University of Florida Golf Course that has since become a target for graffiti artists. The truck ban was lifted in the early 1980s, but reestablished later in the decade after a series of fatal accidents.

Major intersections

Related routes

Gainesville State Road 121 Truck

Florida State Truck Route 121 in Gainesville, Florida was formed in the mid-1970s in order to divert trucks form the congested downtown areas of Gainesville. The route begins at the intersection of State Road 121, Florida State Road 331 and Alachua County Road 23, removing the concurrencies with the SR 24 and 26 Truck Routes. At the intersection with U.S. Route 441, the routes are joined by a truck route of that route as well. The four truck routes run northeast along SR 331 and then curve to the north. SR 331 terminates at the east end of the overlap of SRs 20, 24, and 26, which also serves as the terminus of Florida Truck Routes 24 and 26. However US 441 Truck and Florida Truck Route 121 continue to the northeast until the intersection with Florida State Road 222. At this point, the truck routes turn west overlapping SR 222 and intersection Florida State Road 20. US Truck Route 441 terminates at the intersection of SR 222 and US 441, while Florida Truck Route 121 makes a right turn and follows US 441 northbound until the intersection with its parent route.

County Road 121A

County Road 121A is the sole suffixed alternate of SR 121 that exists within the State of Florida. It is a former segment of SR 121 that exists entirely in LaCrosse. The route is unmarked, and runs along the east side of SR 121 south of downtown to halfway between the SR 121/235 overlap across from the LaCrosse Post Office.

References

121
121
121
121
121
121